Co-dydramol (BAN) is a non-proprietary name used to denote a particular compound analgesic, a combination of dihydrocodeine tartrate and paracetamol.  Co-dydramol tablets are used for the relief of moderate pain.  Co-dydramol is part of a series of combination drugs available in the UK and other countries including co-codaprin (aspirin and codeine).

Formulations
All formulations of co-dydramol contain 500 mg of paracetamol per tablet and may only be sold at a pharmacy as an over-the-counter item without prescription (a P medicine) if containing less than 7.5 mg of dihydrocodeine per tablet.  Higher strengths are prescription only medicines. There are no GSL formulations of co-dydramol, as it is a Schedule 5 controlled drug.  Four strengths of dihydrocodeine tartrate in each tablet are available:
 7.46 mg dihydrocodeine as co-dydramol 7.46/500 (e.g. in the branded product Paramol).
 10 mg dihydrocodeine as co-dydramol 10/500, this is also the preparation to be dispensed if no strength is specified on a prescription.
 20 mg dihydrocodeine as co-dydramol 20/500 (e.g. branded products Paracod 500/20 and Remedeine).
 30 mg dihydrocodeine as co-dydramol 30/500 (e.g. branded products Paracod 500/30 and Remedeine Forte).

Metabolism
Dihydrocodeine is metabolised by the CYP450 system isoenzyme 2D6 to dihydromorphine, which mediates the majority of its analgesic effects. Owing to the low oral bioavailibility of dihydrocodeine (20%), and its subsequent metabolism to active compounds, it is likely that doses below 30mg are sub therapeutic for analgesia.

References
 British National Formulary 2004
 Merck Index 13th Edition
 Oxford textbook of clinical pharmacology Second Edition (09. October 1992)
 Martindale: The complete drug reference 35th Edition (2007)
 Goodman & Gilman's The Pharmacological Basis of Therapeutics, 11th Edition
 Information on the packaging leaflet in Co-dydramol  from Hammed

See also
 Co-proxamol
 Co-codamol
 Co-codaprin

Dydramol
Hepatotoxins
Semisynthetic_opioids